Luciano Lutring (30 December 1937 – 13 May 2013) was an Italian criminal, author and painter, known as  "the submachine gun soloist" ("il solista del mitra"), because he kept the weapon in a violin case.

Born in Milan, Lutring carried out hundreds of robberies in France and Italy during the sixties, for an estimated 35 billion lire.

On 1 September 1965, during a robbery in Paris, Lutring was seriously wounded and remained in critical condition for two months. Sentenced to 22 years in prison, he served 12 years in prison in France, during which he began to write and paint, even exchanging letters with Sandro Pertini, then Italian President of the Chamber of Deputies.  Later, in what is the only recorded case in history, he was pardoned by two presidents, Georges Pompidou of France and Italy's Giovanni Leone.

In 1966, Carlo Lizzani directed a film based on his story, Wake Up and Die, with Robert Hoffmann and Gian Maria Volonté.

References

Further reading
 Andrea Villani, Questo sangue. L'ultima rapina di Luciano Lutring, A.CAR., 2008. .
 Francesco Sannicandro, Nel cielo dei bar. Lutring, il bandito che non sparava, Effequ, 2011. .
 Andrea Villani, Luciano Lutring, Ugo Mursia Editore, 2012. .

1937 births
2013 deaths
Italian male criminals
Italian male writers
Criminals from Milan
Prisoners and detainees of France
Recipients of French presidential pardons
Recipients of Italian presidential pardons